Joaquín Samuel de Anchorena (1876–1961) was an Argentine lawyer and politician, noted for being mayor of Buenos Aires between 1910 and 1914.

Personal life
Anchorena became a lawyer in 1898, after studying in the Faculty of Law and Social Sciences at the University of Buenos Aires. He was a lover of rural activities, and in his youth was dedicated to keeping the La Merced Ranch, which belonged to his mother. In 1900 he married Sara Madero, who bore him three children. She died in 1911, and five years later Anchorena married his second wife, Henrietta Maria Salas. He had three other children with his second wife.

Political life
He was elected national deputy for the City of Buenos Aires in 1908. When Dr. Roque Saenz Pena assumed the Presidency of la Nación in 1910, Anchorena was recommended by the Minister of Public Works, Ezequiel Ramos Mexia, to fill the Municipality of that city. He was later appointed by the President to that office.

During his tenure he gave contracted the engineers Carlos Thays and Benito Carrasco, for the beautification of the Tres de Febrero Park, inaugurating it as the Rosedal. He also opened the first underground tramway done by the Anglo-Argentine Tramways Company (now Underground Line A), on December 1, 1913. Work was carried out on the expansion of the City Hall towards the Rivadavia street, which was extended throughout his term. His term ended in 1914.

Accomplishments
Anchorena also served as Comptroller in the province of Entre Rios. He was part of the Fiscal Oilfields Directory and President of the Columbus Theater.

He served as President of the Argentine Rural Society between 1916 and 1922. In 1917 he founded, within the SRA, the Biological Institute, specializing in research on health issues in agribusiness.

He was also President of the Jockey Club on two occasions (1922-1923) and 1958-1959). Since 1980 the Jockey Club has been presenting an International Award within the racing circuit, which bears his name: the International Joaquin S. Anchorena Grand Prix, for the best Latin American miler.

Anchorena died in Buenos Aires in 1961.

References

1876 births
Lawyers from Buenos Aires
Anchorena family
20th-century Argentine lawyers
Argentine politicians
1961 deaths
Burials at La Recoleta Cemetery